Hornbach Baumarkt AG is a German DIY-store chain offering home improvement and do-it-yourself goods. In the 2020/2021 financial year (March 1, 2020 to February 28, 2021), the Hornbach Baumarkt Group generated sales of Euro 5.1 billion.

The Hornbach Baumarkt Group currently operates a total of 161 DIY megastores with garden centers and online stores in nine European countries, of which 96 stores are located in Germany (plus: Austria, the Netherlands, the Czech Republic, Luxembourg, Switzerland, Sweden, Slovakia, and Romania), as well as two specialist stores for hard flooring (Bodenhaus) in Germany.

Until March 2014, it was 21% owned by Kingfisher plc, a UK company, who also own the B&Q and Castorama DIY chains. Kingfisher sold off the interests as it was planning expansion in new markets that would be in direct competition with Hornbach. Kingfisher has since launched its Screwfix stores in Germany and Brico Dépôt stores in Romania, where Hornbach operates.

History
In the 1960s, the Wilhelm Hornbach OHG was in a bad state, so his grandson Otmar Hornbach launched the idea of a do-it-yourself home improvement store after a visit to the United States. The business was filed on the stock exchange in 1987 and has expanded to a chain of 163 stores.

Otmar Hornbach died on 2 August 2014.

Hornbach in Europe

References

External links

 Hornbach Baumarkt (Germany)
Hornbach International
 Hornbach Holding AG & Co. KGaA

Media
 

German companies established in 1977
Retail companies established in 1977
Companies based in Rhineland-Palatinate
Hardware stores
Kingfisher plc
Neustadt an der Weinstraße